Amantes (English: Lovers) is a Venezuelan telenovela written by Luis Colmenares and produced by RCTV in 2005.

On July 28, 2005, RCTV started broadcasting Amantes weekdays at 9:00pm, replacing Ser bonita no basta. The last episode was broadcast on February 22, 2006.

Chantal Baudaux and Juan Carlos Alarcón star as the protagonists while Aroldo Betancourt and Veronica Schneider star as antagonists.

Plot
It is the dawn of the 20th century that ushers the years of wonder over new discoveries, inventions and the First World War. During this time, Isabel Sarmiento falls in love with Camilo Rivera and gives herself to him, not knowing that Saúl Bejarano a primitive landowner with power, had already decided to marry her. The girl must sacrifice her love, bound by a family debt and Saúl's threats, as he had witnessed a murder committed by Isabel's father.

She agrees to be Saúl's wife. She has no other option: she fears her family's ruin, jail for her father and knows that her lover's life is in danger. 
Camilo leaves as soon as the wedding is held, believing he has lost Isabel forever.

Important events that would change everyone's life, begin to unravel. The lovers must overcome many barriers to find ultimate happiness.

Cast

Main cast
Chantal Baudaux as Isabel Sarmiento de Bejarano
Juan Carlos Alarcón as Camilo Rivera
Aroldo Betancourt as Saúl Bejarano
Verónica Schneider as Erika Hoffman
Jean Carlo Simancas as Humberto Rivera
Carlota Sosa as Eugenia Vda. de Sarmiento
Gustavo Rodríguez as Virgilio Sarmiento

Supporting cast
 
 Dad Dáger as Leonor Rivera
 Iván Tamayo as Consenso Mendible
 Juan Carlos Gardie as Atanasio
 Esperanza Magaz as Matea
 Ana Castell as Arawaca
 Emerson Rondón as Lucas
 Carlos Felipe Álvarez as Francisco
 Yelena Maciel as Teresa Rivera
 Gioia Arismendi as Carmelina
 Samuel González as Gudelio Gomez
 Katyuska Rivas as Celina
 Roraima Karina Viera
 Katherine Viera 
 Eduardo Ortega as Vincent De Boer
 Catherina Cardozo as La Romana
 Carmen Landaeta as Etilita
 Carlos Herrera as Coyote
 Gerardo Soto as Brandon Griffith
 Mark Colina as Lisandro
 Candy Montesinos as Otillia Barrientos
 Reinaldo Zavarce as Alirio Bejarano
 Pedro Durán as Ismael Gómez
 Tony Rodríguez as Nerio Pantoja
 Eric Noriega as Padre Nicanor
 Jean Samuel Khoury as Alirio Bejarano
 Giselle Pita as Teresita
 Ogladih Mayorga as Charito
 Alexandra Rodríguez as Finita
 Jessika Grau as Consuelo
 Eva De Denghy as Consuelo's mother

References

External links
 

Spanish-language telenovelas
2005 telenovelas
Venezuelan telenovelas
RCTV telenovelas
2005 Venezuelan television series debuts
2006 Venezuelan television series endings
Television shows set in Venezuela